is an indoor sporting arena located in Toyohira-ku, Sapporo, Japan. Sometimes called Kitayell, the capacity of the main arena is 8,000. It hosted some of the group games for the 2006 FIBA World Championship and also for the 2006 Women's Volleyball World Championship.

Kitayell also has a second arena for smaller events, and a public exercise gym with treadmills, weights, and weight machines.

Access 
 Tōhō Line: Connected directly by an underground passage from Toyohira-Kōen Station.

References

External links
 Official Site (Japanese)

Indoor arenas in Japan
Levanga Hokkaido
Sports venues in Sapporo
Toyohira-ku, Sapporo
Basketball venues in Japan
Sports venues completed in 1999
1999 establishments in Japan
Volleyball venues in Japan